Helicopter Maritime Strike Squadron Seven Nine (HSM-79) "Griffins" is a United States Navy helicopter squadron based at Naval Air Station North Island, California, United States.

The unit operates the Sikorsky MH-60R Seahawk which provides deployed aircraft and crews to ships of the Sixth Fleet.

The unit has a detachment deployed to Naval Station Rota, Spain, by the end of 2022 the entire squadron will permanently deploy to Rota, to support European based ships.

References

Helicopter maritime strike squadrons of the United States Navy